Quesa is a municipality in the comarca of Canal de Navarrés in the Valencian Community, Spain.

References

Municipalities in the Province of Valencia
Canal de Navarrés